(Sanskrit, खेचरी मुद्रा) is a hatha yoga practice carried out by curling the tip of the tongue back into the mouth until it reaches above the soft palate and into the nasal cavity. In the full practice, the tongue is made long enough to do this with many months of daily tongue stretching and by gradually severing the lingual frenulum with a sharp implement over a period of months. 

The goal is to attain liberation in the body, by sealing in the energy of bindu in the head so that it is not lost.

Context 

Haṭha yoga is a branch of the largely spiritual practice of yoga, though it makes use of physical techniques; it was developed in medieval times, much later than the meditative and devotional forms of yoga. Its goals however are similar: siddhis or magical powers, and mukti, liberation. In Haṭha yoga, liberation was often supposed to be attainable in the body, made immortal through the practices of Haṭha yoga. Among its techniques were mudrās, meant to seal in or control energies such as kundalini and bindu. Khecarī mudrā is one such technique.

Mudrā 

In the beginning stages and for most practitioners, the tip of the tongue touches the soft palate as far back as possible without straining, or is placed in contact with the uvula at the back of the mouth. Mudrā (Sanskrit, मुद्रा, literally "seal"), when used in yoga, is a position intended to awaken spiritual energies in the body.

The Buddhist Pali canon contains three passages in which the Buddha describes pressing the tongue against the palate for the purposes of controlling hunger or the mind, depending on the passage. 

A hatha yoga text, the Khecarīvidyā, states that khechari mudrā enables one to raise Kundalini and access various stores of amrita in the head, which subsequently flood the body. The god Shiva, in the same text, gives instructions on how to cut the lingual frenulum as a necessary prerequisite for the khechari mudra practice:

A tantric Saiva text, the Mālinīvijayottaratantra, warns:

Bhattacharyya defines  as the "Yogic posture which bestows spiritual attainment and enables one to overcome disease and death." He explains that "Kha denotes brahman, and that power which moves (cara) as the kinetic energy of brahman is known (as) Khecarī." Singh defines  as "the bliss of the vast expanse of spiritual consciousness, also known as divya mudrā or Śivāvasthā (the state of Śivā)." He further identifies it in a higher sense—with the end state of consciousness, and not just the physical posture used to achieve that end: "So Khecarī Mudrā in Śaiva āgama means a state of universal consciousness which is the state of Śiva." Abhinavagupta, in his Tantraloka, states that all other mudras derive from khecarī mudrā, which he describes as "the stance of moving or flying through the void of the supreme consciousness." The practice is also mentioned in the Hatha Yoga Pradipika (III. 6–7).

In recent times, khecarī mudrā was taught by Paramahansa Yogananda as a part of Kriya Yoga practice. He stated that:

According to Swami Kriyananda, "The assumption of this mudra helps to hasten the advent of deep spiritual states of consciousness." Swami Sivananda described  as "the best of all Mudras."

Notes

References

Sources 

 
 
 
 
 
 
 
 
 
 
 
 
 
 
 
 

Mudras